The Michigan Wolverines women's volleyball team represents the University of Michigan in National Collegiate Athletics Association (NCAA) Division I competition.  The women's volleyball program at the University of Michigan began in 1973.  Erin Virtue has been the coach since 2023.  The team plays its home matches at Cliff Keen Arena.

History

Vong years (1973–1983)

Sandy Vong was the first head coach of the Michigan Wolverines women's volleyball program.  He held the position for 11 years from 1973 to 1983.  Vong's 1981 team compiled a 40-17 record, captured the school's first Big Ten Conference volleyball championship, won the AIAW Regional Championship, and finished in eighth place at the AIAW National Championship.

Three coaches (1984–1991)
During the eight years from 1984 to 1991, the Michigan women's volleyball program had three head coaches: Barb Canning (1984-1985), Joyce Davis (1986-1989), and Peggy Bradley-Doppes (1990-1991).  The team compiled a winning record in only one of those eight years, a 19-12 finish in 1991.

Giovanazzi years (1992–1998)
In 1992, Peggy Bradley-Doppes stepped down as Michigan's head volleyball coach to focus on her duties as the school's women's athletic director.  Greg Giovanazzi, a former All-American volleyball player at UCLA, was hired to replace her.  Giovanazzi led the team for seven years from 1992 to 1998. The 1997 Michigan team reached the 20-win level for the first time since 1987 and was the subject of a profile in the Chicago Tribune indicating that the program was experiencing a renaissance.  The 1997 team ultimately compiled a 21-12 record, finished in third place in the Big Ten, and advanced to the NCAA Tournament for the first time in the program's history. The team lost to Texas A&M in the second round of the 1997 tournament.

Interest in the sport at Michigan declined after the 1997 season, with average home attendance dropping to less than 600 during the 1998 season.  Giovanazzi was replaced as Michigan's head volleyball coach after the 1998 season.

Rosen years (1999–2022)

Mark Rosen was hired as the head coach of the Michigan Wolverines women's volleyball team in 1999.  He had previously been a volleyball coach at Cal State Bakersfield (1992–93), Northern Michigan University (1994–97) and Boise State University (1998) Since taking over the program, Rosen has led the Wolverines to national prominence.  His teams have advanced to the NCAA Tournament in 12 of his first 14 years as head coach and have reached the 20-win level for seven consecutive years from 2006 to 2012.  Between 2006 and 2012, the team has compiled an overall record of 170–67.

In 2008, Rosen broke Sandy Vong's team record for career wins at Michigan. The 2008 team compiled a 26–9 record, marking the first time the team had reached 20 wins in three consecutive seasons.

In 2009, Rosen's team compiled a 27–10 record, defeated No. 4-ranked Stanford in the second round of the NCAA Tournament, and ultimately advanced to the Elite Eight round of the NCAA Tournament.

In 2011, Michigan again defeated Stanford in the NCAA Tournament, reaching the Round of 16.  In 2012, the team compiled a 27–12 record and advanced to the National Semifinal round of the NCAA Tournament for the first time in program history.

In June 2013, the Michigan women's volleyball team toured Argentina and Brazil and played 10 matches against local teams.  The Wolverines compiled a 9–1 record on their South American tour.  The final three matches were against the Brazilian Youth National Team, and Michigan won two of the three matches.

After the 2022 season, Michigan athletic director Warde Manuel announced that Rosen would not return for the 2023 season, after 24 seasons as the head coach.

Virtue years (2023–present)
On January 17, 2023, Erin Virtue was hired as the head coach to replace Rosen. Prior to Michigan, Virtue was the offensive coordinator for the United States women's national volleyball team, and the director of the USA National Team Development Program. Virtue had also previously served as an assistant coach at Michigan from 2011 to 2015 as well as Northwestern (2016–18), Cincinnati (2007–10), and Loyola Chicago (2006).

Coaching Staff

Facilities

Since 1989, the team has played its home matches at Cliff Keen Arena located on Hoover Street in the school's athletic campus between the Administration Building and the Intramural Building. The facility has a seating capacity of 1,800 and is also used by Michigan's men's gymnatics and wrestling teams.  It was built in 1956 for the Michigan swimming and diving team and was known as the Matt Mann Pool from 1956 to 1988 and as Varsity Arena from 1988 to 1989.

Coaching records
The Michigan women's volleyball team has had six head coaches since it was established in 1973. Their coaching records are as follows:

Notable players

AVCA All-Americans
In 2003, Erin Moore became the first Michigan volleyball player to be selected as an All-American by the American Volleyball Coaches Association (AVCA).  In 2009, Lexi Zimmerman became Michigan's first player to receive first-team All-America honors.  In total, 16 Michigan women's volleyball players have received All-American recognition from the AVCA 24 times.
Erin Moore – 2003 (third team)
Katie Bruzdzinski – 2006 (honorable mention), 2007 (honorable mention)
Lexi Zimmerman – 2007 (honorable mention), 2008 (second team), 2009 (first team), 2010 (second team)
Juliana Paz – 2009 (third team)
Alex Hunt – 2010 (third team)
Jennifer Cross – 2012 (third team)
Lexi Erwin – 2012 (honorable mention)
Molly Toon – 2013 (honorable mention)
Lexi Dannemiller – 2013 (honorable mention)
Abby Cole – 2014 (honorable mention), 2015 (second team), 2016 (second team)
MacKenzi Welsh – 2016 (honorable mention), 2019 (honorable mention)
Claire Kieffer-Wright – 2017 (honorable mention)
Carly Skjodt – 2017 (third team), 2018 (second team)
Jenna Lerg – 2018 (honorable mention)
Paige Jones – 2019 (third team)
Jess Mruzik – 2021 (honorable mention)

Big Ten Medal of Honor
Three Michigan women's volleyball players have won the Big Ten Medal of Honor.
Alison Noble – 1984
Andrea Williams – 1985
Shareen Luze – 1997

Big Ten Defensive Player of the Year

Stesha Selsky – 2007

All-Big Ten
Nineteen Michigan women's volleyball players have received All-Big Ten Conference recognition.
Michelle Horrigan – 1991 (second team), 1992 (second team)
Shannon Brownlee – 1995 (first team)
Linnea Mendoza – 1997 (first team)
Erin Moore – 2002 (first team), 2003 (first team)
Lisa Gamalaski – 2004 (first team)
Katie Bruzdzinski – 2006 (first team), 2007 (first team)
Lexi Zimmerman – 2008 (first team), 2009 (first team), 2010 (first team)
Juliana Paz – 2009 (first team)
Alex Hunt – 2010 (first team)
Jennifer Cross – 2012 (first team), 2013 (first team)
Lexi Erwin – 2012 (first team)
Abby Cole - 2014 (first team), 2015 (first team), 2016 (first team)
Carly Skjodt - 2017 (first team), 2018 (first team)
Jenna Lerg - 2018 (second team)
Paige Jones – 2019 (first team)
MacKenzi Welsh – 2019 (first team)
Cori Crocker – 2019 (second team)
Jess Mruzik – 2021 (first team), 2022 (first team)
Hannah Grant – 2022 (second team)

Individual records
Michigan team records are based on the Michigan Volleyball Record Book.

Kills
Match: Paige Jones (37) vs. Indiana 3/12/21
Season: Lexi Erwin – 614 in 2012
Career: Katie Bruzdzinski – 1,895 from 2004 to 2007

Attack attempts
Match: Lexi Erwin – 87 vs. Texas 12/13/12
Season: Lexi Erwin – 1,701 in 2021
Career: Katie Bruzdzinski – 5,097 from 2004 to 2007

Hitting percentage
Match: Jacque Boney – .813 vs. Rutgers 9/23/22
Season: Abby Cole – .359 in 2014
Career: Jess Robinson – .341 from 2019 to 2022

Assists
Match: Linnea Mendoza – 95 vs. Illinois 11/29/96
Season: Lexi Zimmerman – 1,685 in 2007
Career: Lexi Zimmerman – 5,903 from 2007 to 2010

Digs
Match: Jayne Hickman – 43 vs. Wisconsin 9/21/85
Season: Stesha Selsky – 762 in 2007
Career: Stesha Selsky – 2,178 from 2004 to 2007

Total blocks
Match: Kim Clover – 14 vs. Northwestern 9/24/88
Season: Jennifer Cross – 181 in 2012
Career: Jennifer Cross – 543 from 2010 to 2013

Service aces
Match: Alex Hunt – 9 vs. Marquette 9/18/09
Season: Lisa Vahi – 78 in 1986
Career: Marie Ann Davidson – 239 from 1985 to 1988

Matches played
Career: Tie between Lexi Zimmerman – 140 from 2007 to 2010 and Sloane Donhoff - 140 from 2008 to 2011

See also
List of NCAA Division I women's volleyball programs

References

External links